USS Bali (ID 2483) was a large Dutch freighter seized in New York City by the U.S. Customs Service during World War I. She was assigned to the U.S. Navy and later the U.S. Army as a cargo ship to be used to carry military cargo to Allied forces in France. After a number of transatlantic voyages, she was returned to the Dutch government at war's end. She subsequently remained busy transporting cargo until World War II, when she was wrecked by Luftwaffe bombers in the Mediterranean.  Her remains were reclaimed and disposed of by scrapping in 1951.

Seized by U.S. Customs 

Bali – a single screw steel-hulled freighter completed in 1917 at Rotterdam, the Netherlands by the Rotterdam Dry Dock Co. for the Stoomvaart Maatschappij Nederland – was seized by customs officials at New York City under Proclamation 1436 of 20 March 1918 (40 Stat. 1761); inspected by the Navy at New York on 23 March 1918; assigned the identification number (Id. No.) 2483; and commissioned at New York on 27 March.

World War I service

Assigned to NOTS 

Assigned to the Naval Overseas Transportation Service (NOTS) on an Army Account, Bali began loading cargo less than two hours after going into commission. She completed the evolution, as well as the bunkering of her fuel, by 1630 on 1 April 1918. Sailing two hours later to chase and join a convoy that had left the harbor five hours earlier, Bali developed engineering difficulties that compelled her to anchor off Tompkinsville, Staten Island, to carry out repairs.

First voyage to France 

Underway again on 9 April with another convoy, Bali still failed to maintain speed well enough to keep pace, and she had to put in at Halifax, Nova Scotia, for repairs on 16 April. She resumed her voyage once again on 28 April; and this time, Bali reached Brest, France, on 14 May despite a rough passage.

She steamed thence to St. Nazaire the following day, but a crowded harbor kept her waiting for a berth. Finally able to discharge a portion of her cargo, she left St. Nazaire for Nantes on 6 June, where labor conditions were such that German prisoners of war had to be employed working the ship's hatches during the unloading process. She finished working her cargo and proceeded down the Loire River early in the evening of 15 June. Bali joined a convoy the following day and, after returning briefly to Brest on 16 June, sailed for the United States on the afternoon of 18 June. She reached Hoboken, New Jersey, on 2 July.

Second voyage to France 

Taking on board 6,759 tons of general cargo, Bali put to sea for Hampton Roads, Virginia, on 18 July and reached her destination the next day, mooring alongside the battleship USS Mississippi (BB-41) at the Norfolk Navy Yard. While in the yard, Bali received her main and secondary batteries, a 5-inch gun and a 6-pounder that had originally been installed on board the battleship USS Arkansas (BB-31) and the cruiser USS Raleigh (C-8), respectively. Moving out of the yard on the morning of 21 July, she joined a convoy and sailed that afternoon for France.

On 8 August, a few days before arriving at her destination, Bali observed a steamer on her starboard side sounding a submarine warning and opening fire on a "suspicious object" in the water. Bali opened fire with her forward gun, but apparently neither ship scored any hits. Dropping anchor in Quiberon Bay on 10 August, she proceeded thence first to La Pallice and then to Bordeaux on 13 August. After unloading her cargo, the freighter sailed for New York on 21 August and reached that port on 5 September.

Third voyage to France 

Sent to Hoboken on 6 September, the ship loaded 6,887 tons of general cargo and underwent repairs to her engines. Following a trial trip on 16 September, she sailed on 18 September for France. Reaching Verdon Roads on 5 October, Bali unloaded a portion of her cargo to a barge before mooring to a dock at Bordeaux on 9 October to finish unloading. She had to wait a number of days for a return convoy to be formed, but Bali finally sailed west again on the afternoon of 24 October and arrived back in New York on 7 November.

Transporting horses to France 

Word of the impending armistice with the Central Powers delayed the installation of stalls to enable her to serve as a horse transport. Three days after the armistice, however, she was docked at the Bush Docks in Hoboken, New Jersey, where modifications were made to accommodate 600 horses. Bali took the animals on board soon thereafter and loaded 2,551 tons of general cargo before sailing for France on 30 November. Reaching Verdon Roads on 14 December, the ship then proceeded up the Gironde River to Bordeaux on 16 December, where she discharged her cargo and loaded steel rails for ballast. She stood back down the river two days after Christmas of 1918, bound for the United States.

Bali collides off Sewall's Point 

Bali dropped anchor in Hampton Roads late on 11 January 1919, and shifted to a mooring at Newport News, Virginia, the following day. There, workmen came on board and removed the horse stalls on 13 and 14 January. On the afternoon of 15 January, Bali entered the yard at the Newport News Shipbuilding & Dry Dock Co., where her guns were removed.

From there, she proceeded to the Engineer Depot dock at Lambert's Point on 23 January, where she unloaded the steel rail ballast she had carried from France. The ship then shifted to a berth off Sewall's Point on 28 January. The next day, a flood tide and a strong breeze caused her to drag her anchors and drift down on the freighter Bonafan. The collision caused no great damage to either ship, and Bali steamed away under her own power. After coaling on 31 January, the freighter sailed for Baltimore, Maryland, on 3 February.

Transfer to the Shipping Board 

Having been transferred from the NOTS Army Account to the Shipping Board Account on 1 February 1919, Bali reached Baltimore on 4 February and loaded 7,458 tons of Food Administration flour, peas, and beans earmarked for European relief. Then, having had "otter gear" installed for minesweeping at that port, she departed Baltimore for Denmark on 14 February. Reaching Copenhagen on 7 March, Bali unloaded her cargo and sailed for the British Isles on 20 March. Proceeding via the Kiel Canal and Heligoland, she reached Yarmouth on 23 March to await a pilot; proceeding thence to Harwich and Plymouth, she reached the latter port on 25 March. She remained there until 29 March, when she sailed, in ballast, for the United States.

Bali made port at New York City on 10 April, mooring at Jersey City, New Jersey that same afternoon. Moving thence to the Morgan Pier on 17 April and Shewan's Drydock on 19 April, she underwent repairs on 19 and 20 April.

Final war support voyage 

After that, Bali moved to the West Shore Railroad dock on 22 April and loaded a cargo of lard and flour. She sailed for Europe on 29 April. Touching briefly at Falmouth, England, on 11 May for sailing orders and onward routing, she pushed on the next day, reaching Hamburg, Germany, on the morning of 16 May.

Decommissioning

Arriving at Amsterdam on the morning of 24 May, Bali entered the Amsterdamsche Drydock Company drydock on 27 May. She was decommissioned at Amsterdam on 30 May 1919 and was returned to her owners. Her name was struck from the Navy list simultaneously.

Subsequent destruction in World War II 

Stoomvaart Maatschappij Nederland operated Bali until sometime in 1932 when she was acquired by Georges Portolo. Her port of registry then became Ithaca, Greece and she was renamed Max Wolf. The freighter operated under Greek colors until bombed by German planes off the coast of France between Roque and Berville, and two of her crew killed, on 9 June 1940. Run aground to prevent her sinking, the wreck was used as a bombing target by the Luftwaffe during the German occupation of France. The wreck was subsequently broken up for scrap about 1951.

References 

 
 Bali (Dutch Freighter, 1917). Served as USS Bali (ID # 2483) in 1918–1919
 NavSource Online: Bali (ID 2483)

Ships built in Rotterdam
1917 ships
World War I merchant ships of the Netherlands
World War I auxiliary ships of the United States
World War I cargo ships of the United States
Merchant ships of the Netherlands
Cargo ships of Greece
World War II merchant ships of Greece
Ships sunk by German aircraft
Maritime incidents in June 1940
Shipwrecks of France